Dmitri Sergeyevich Malyaka (born 15 January 1990) is a Russian former football player.

Career

Club
Malyaka made his debut in the Russian Premier League on 10 April 2011 for FC Rostov in a game against FC Volga Nizhny Novgorod.

On 2 October 2018, Malyaka was one of five players to leave Ararat Yerevan.

On 25 February 2020, FC Pyunik announced the signing of Malyaka, with Malyaka leaving the club on 2 July 2020 after his contract had expired.

International
Malyaka represented Artsakh at the 2019 CONIFA European Football Cup.

References

External links
 
 
 

1990 births
Sportspeople from Omsk
Living people
Russian footballers
Russia youth international footballers
Russia under-21 international footballers
Russia national football B team footballers
Association football midfielders
Russian Premier League players
Armenian Premier League players
FC Rostov players
FC Tom Tomsk players
FC Volga Nizhny Novgorod players
FC Angusht Nazran players
FC Yenisey Krasnoyarsk players
FC Spartak Moscow players
FC Luch Vladivostok players
FC Ararat Yerevan players
FC Neftekhimik Nizhnekamsk players
FC Gomel players
FC Pyunik players
Russian expatriate footballers
Expatriate footballers in Armenia
Expatriate footballers in Belarus